The Brahmin Swarnkar are an Indian caste of Shrimali Brahmans, which developed from Shrimal Nagar (today it is known as Bhinmal). They are called "Brahmin Swarnkars" because a group of Brahmins adopted a Swarnkar business for their enhancement of life style, and so these Brahmins are called as Brahmin Swarnkars. Sawrnkars are mainly found in local areas of Rajasthan.

References

External links
http://brahminswarnkar.com
http://brahmanswarnkar.org

Brahmin communities